Manameldura Piyadasa de Zoysa (born 1910) was a Ceylonese politician.

De Zoysa was involved in Sri Lankan politics before the country's independence and was associated with the State Council of Ceylon established under the Donoughmore Constitution.

In 1956 he was elected to Parliament in the seat of Ambalangoda-Balapitiya, representing the Mahajana Eksath Peramuna. In 1959 he was appointed the Minister of Labour in the cabinet of W. Dahanayake.

At the Parliamentary elections in March 1960 he was elected in the seat of Rathgama, retaining the seat in the subsequent elections in July that year. De Zoysa subsequently resigned from the seat in late 1960 following his implication in the Thalagodapitiya Bribery Commission. He later accepted a position in the Senate of Ceylon, replacing G. P. Wickramarachchi.

References

Labour ministers of Sri Lanka
Members of the 3rd Parliament of Ceylon
Members of the 4th Parliament of Ceylon
Members of the 5th Parliament of Ceylon
Parliamentary secretaries of Ceylon
Members of the Senate of Ceylon
1910 births
Year of death missing
Sri Lankan politicians convicted of crimes